ALLMOST (styled as ALLMO$T) is a Filipino hip hop group which consists of members Clien Alcazar, Russell dela Fuente, Jomuel "Jom" Casem and Angelo Luigi "Crakky" Timog.

History 
Olongapo-based rappers Russel dela Fuente and Angelo Luigi "Crakky" Timog both met in college and formed the group. The duo then found Jom and Clien on a social media app singing and after seeing their potential, invited them to join the group.

Jomuel Casem, residing in Canada and Clien Alcazar, from Italy both have their Filipino roots from their parents and collaborated with their songs via email.

In 2018, the group released their first single titled "Bagay Tayo". In 2019, they released another single titled "Dalaga" (not associated with Arvey de Vera's song of the same title), in which a challenge called #DalagangFilipinaChallenge surfaced online. Later that same year, they signed a recording contract with Viva Records.

Discography

Singles 
"Bagay Tayo" (2018)
"Gimmie Tonight" (2018)
"Seloso" (with Xaje) (2018)
"Dalaga" (2019)
"Dulo" (2019)
"Carousel" (with Yuri) (2019)
"Kahit Na" (2019)
"Miracle Nights" (with L.A Goons & Peso Mercado) (2019)
"NAIA" (with Because) (2019)
"One Night" (2019)
"One Way" (2019)
"Exchange Gift" (2019)
"Pagsuko" (2020)
Sulyap      ( 2020)
Wag Muna (2020)  feat(Crakky) and ( Soulstice)
Love you     ( with Jomuel Casem)
Buti ka pa masaya ka  feat Jomuel Casem) and (Angelo Luigi ''Crakky'' Timog)
Mainam   feat Crakky Timog
Crush (2020)
Sana'y Mapasakin (2021) (with LA GOON$)
Hook Up (2022)

Awards and nominations

References 

People from Olongapo
Filipino hip hop groups
Filipino pop music groups
Musical groups established in 2018
2018 establishments in the Philippines